Mehmet Aurélio (born Marco Aurélio Brito dos Prazeres, 15 December 1977) is a Brazilian-born Turkish football coach and retired footballer, who played as a midfielder. He was most recently an assistant coach of Fenerbahçe.

Club career
The midfielder started his career in the country of his birth with Flamengo, where he made over 100 appearances, before joining Olaria.

He moved to Turkey with Trabzonspor in June 2001 and on to Fenerbahçe in June 2003, where he has become a key member of the squad. During his time in Turkey he has won a number of honours, including the three league titles and the Turkish Super Cup with Fenerbahce and the Turkish Cup with Trabzonspor. He would then leave for Spanish side Real Betis playing 69 games and scoring 6 goals before returning to Turkey on free transfer, signing a 2-year contract with Beşiktaş. His wage would be basic salary plus bonus per number of game he played. On 11 May 2011, he converted his penalty in the shootout as the Istanbul team won the Turkish Cup against İstanbul BB (4–3, 2–2 after extra time). His contract with Beşiktaş expired in the summer of 2012.

Mehmet Aurélio signed with his former club Olaria on 1 March 2013, where he retired at the end of the season.

International career
Mehmet Aurélio made his debut for Turkey in August 2006 against Luxembourg. He was a regular for Fatih Terim's side during their Euro 2008 qualification campaign, starting 11 of the 12 games.

Style of play
Aurélio is a defensive or central midfielder renowned for his strong tackling and big match temperament, aiding the midfield with an important combination of strength, stamina, technique and tactical expertise.

Career statistics

International goals

Honours
Trabzonspor
Turkish Cup: 2002–03

Fenerbahçe
Süper Lig: 2003–04, 2004–05, 2006–07
Turkish Super Cup: 2006–07

Beşiktaş
Turkish Cup: 2010–11

Turkey
UEFA European Championship bronze medalist:2008

References

External links

CBF 

1977 births
Living people
Footballers from Rio de Janeiro (city)
Brazilian footballers
Naturalized citizens of Turkey
Brazilian emigrants to Turkey
Turkish people of Brazilian descent
Turkish footballers
Turkey international footballers
Fenerbahçe S.K. footballers
UEFA Euro 2008 players
Expatriate footballers in Spain
La Liga players
Real Betis players
Association football midfielders
Olaria Atlético Clube players
CR Flamengo footballers
Süper Lig players
Trabzonspor footballers
Beşiktaş J.K. footballers
Fenerbahçe S.K. (football) non-playing staff
Turkish expatriate footballers
Turkish expatriate sportspeople in Spain
Brazilian expatriate footballers
Brazilian expatriate sportspeople in Spain